King's Cathedral and Chapels, sometimes referred to as King's or KC, is an international Pentecostal multi-site megachurch based in Kahului, Hawaii. It is affiliated with the Assemblies of God USA. The church, originally called First Assembly of God Maui, was established in the year of 1980 by the church's current Global Senior Pastors, Dr. James Marocco and Pastor Colleen Marocco. King's Cathedral and Chapels is primarily remarked for its multiple services, multiple ministries, multiple outreaches, multiple extensions, early morning prayer meetings, theatrical productions, original worship music, and life groups.

History
In 1935, a Pentecostal missionary couple, James Creighton and Juanita Creighton, moved to the island of Maui after Juanita had been healed of a cancerous tumor. They began to preach in Paia, Hawaii and founded the Full Gospel Church of Paia. In 1949, Juanita Creighton retired and handed her church over to the Assemblies of God, who had assigned pastors to the church over periods of years. Prior to 1980, the church sold their property in Paia, Hawaii and moved down to Kahului, Hawaii and constructed the Kane Street Chapel by hand. Before the Maroccos became the official pastors, the church had done a media blitz through radio and newspapers, of which First Assembly of God Maui was also the first church on Maui to do.

In 1980, Dr. James Marocco and Colleen Marocco became the new Senior Pastors of First Assembly of God Maui. On their first official Sunday as the Senior Pastors, the size of the congregation doubled from 100 to 200, causing it to become the largest Evangelical church on the island. In three months, the church grew to 300 congregants. By the end of their first year of ministry, they grew to 700 congregants, with their one-year anniversary celebration being held in a high school gymnasium, numbering over 2,500 attendees, being the largest Christian gathering on the island of Maui in over 150 years. During this period, First Assembly of God Maui became one of the fastest-growing churches in the United States.

In 1982, to be able to accommodate the growth of the church, First Assembly purchased what was then the Maui Skate Palace, the largest auditorium at the time, and renovated it to serve as a church building.  In 1983, First Assembly of God adopted the multi-site church model, establishing extension churches in Kaunakakai, Hawaii and Lahaina, Hawaii, now believing to be one church on the three islands of Maui County: Maui, Molokai, and Lanai. The church had also begun it's ethno-linguistic ministries, establishing the Filipino Ministry. In 1984, Dr. James Marocco began efforts to purchase property on what is now the corner of Maui Veterans Highway and Airport Road, the busiest intersection on the island of Maui. Dr. James Marocco's father, Pastor Daniel Marocco, had joined his staff team after having previously served as the senior pastor for what was then Bethel Manila Temple (currently the Cathedral of Praise). He established early morning prayer meetings, which are currently replicated among the numerous extensions across the world.

On February 1, 1988, First Assembly of God closed escrow on the property on the corner of Maui Veterans Highway and Airport Road, and the church began construction on the cathedral, the central hub for the church as a whole and the largest church facility throughout the State of Hawaii. By 1989, an extension church had been established on Lanai, which fulfilled the church's vision of being one church on three islands.

In 1994, First Assembly finished construction on the cathedral. In 1995, the church held a series of revival meetings with Evangelist Rodney Howard-Browne, which caused the church to change. First, they established the Prophetic Conference (currently the Power Conference), in which registered attendees are personally prophesied over in call-out rooms. Second, they began to establish extension churches outside of Maui County, with the first wave of extension campuses established before the year 2000 being Honokaa, Hawaii; ʻEleʻele, Hawaii; Honolulu, Hawaii; Wasilla, Alaska; Seattle, Washington; Antioch, California; Iwakuni, Japan; Tahiti; and Tonga. Lastly, it solidified their place among the Apostolic-Prophetic Movement, accepting certain Christian figures as being apostles and prophets.

In 2000, First Assembly of God Maui changed their name to King's Cathedral and Chapels to avoid confusion with an already existing church named "First Assembly of God". The central hub in Kahului, Hawaii was referred to as either "King's Cathedral Maui" or "King's Cathedral" with the other extension campuses being referred to as either "King's Chapel", "KC", or "King's" with the location in front.

Starting in the year of 2007, King's Cathedral and Chapels began to have goals called Visions.  In 2007, King's launched the 12-12-12 Vision, believing to be one church with 12 extensions in Hawaii, 12 extensions in the United States, and extensions in 12 nations outside of the United States.  When it was fulfilled in 2010, King's launched the 120-20 Vision, believing to be one church with 120 extensions globally and ministering to 20,000 congregants globally.  When it was fulfilled in 2015, King's launched the 1-2-3 Vision, believing to be one church with 100 extensions in the United States, 200 extensions internationally (outside of the United States), and ministering to 30,000 congregants globally.  When it was fulfilled in 2020, King's launched Vision 500, believing to be one church with 500 extensions globally.  As of May 2021, that Vision was expanded into the current Vision of King's: the 12-120 Vision, believing to be one church with 1,200 extensions and 120,000 congregants globally.

Currently, King's has over 460 extensions and 45,000 congregants globally, consisting of extensions on all six major islands of Hawaii, 23 states in America, and 18 nations internationally.  They have plans to establish extension campuses in all 50 states and expanding into the nations of Germany, Indonesia, India, Laos, Cambodia, Jamaica, Haiti, Guatemala, Gabon, and Israel.

Organization
Currently, Dr. James Marocco and Pastor Colleen Marocco serve together jointly as the Global Senior Pastors of King's Cathedral and Chapels.  For their extensions in the United States, official members of King's elect candidates to take positions in the board of directors.  The Board of Directors assists the Senior Pastoral Leadership in making certain financial decisions.  Eligible candidates are determined prior to the elections, and all candidates are already existing official members of the church.

Affiliations
King's Cathedral and Chapels is officially a part of the Assemblies of God USA, being a part of the Hawaii District of the Assemblies of God.

Dr. James Marocco serves as on the board of directors for Christ for the Nations Institute in Dallas, Texas.  He is also a Board Member of Church Growth International, an international church growth organization promoting the growth of churches across the world.

Controversy
In March 2021, the church was linked to a cluster of cases of COVID-19. The church was asked to stop in-person events by the Hawaii Department of Health, but it refused.

References

External links
Church Growth International

Pentecostal churches in the United States
Megachurches in the United States
Assemblies of God churches
Churches in Hawaii
Religious buildings and structures in Maui County, Hawaii
Megachurches in Hawaii